Rao Sahib Ganpatrao Narayanrao Madiman (20 May 1879 – 10 May 1947) was a noted businessman, banker, cotton yarn and cloth Merchant from Hubli in the erstwhile Bombay Presidency of British India.

Early life

Madiman was born in a Saraswat Brahmin family of Canara region and did his early education at Sirsi and later at Hubli.

Career

Madiman started his early career with mercantile service in Southern Mahratta Spinning and Weaving Company in 1897, serving under various capacities, but quit the service in 1907 to start his own business of cotton yarn and textiles under the name of M/S G.N.Madiman and sons, to later become a noted banker and businessman of the Hubli region. He served as magistrate for 1929-37 of Hubli and other posts like Village Munsiff and Chairman of Hubli Taluka War Gifts Fund Committee.

Personal life

Madiman was married to Laxmibai Amladi Vinekar from Kundapur and had three sons and two daughters.

He took an active interest in community service and was noted for his contributions to the Woman's Hospital, Shri Shiva Krishna Mandir, the Nagarkar Library, the J G College of Commerce and the Maharashtra Mandal at Hubli.

References

1879 births
1947 deaths
Indian businesspeople in textiles
People from Hubli
Rai Sahibs
Indian bankers
Businesspeople from Karnataka
20th-century Indian businesspeople
19th-century Indian businesspeople
Businesspeople in British India